Li Hao (born 29 January 1992 in Helong, Yanbian) is a Chinese footballer of Korean descent who currently plays for Chinese Super League side Hebei China Fortune.

Club career
Li Hao started his professional football career in 2011 when he was promoted to Yanbian FC's first squad. On 15 April 2016, he made his debut for Yanbian FC in the 2016 Chinese Super League against Shandong Luneng, coming on as a substitute for Pei Yuwen in the 86th minute.

Career statistics
Statistics accurate as of match played 31 December 2020.

Honours

Club
Yanbian FC
 China League One: 2015

References

External links
 

1992 births
Living people
Chinese footballers
Association football midfielders
People from Yanbian
Yanbian Funde F.C. players
Hebei F.C. players
Chinese Super League players
China League One players
China League Two players
Chinese people of Korean descent
Footballers from Jilin